Christoffer Knudsson Urne til Årsmarke (27 October 1593 – 27 September 1663) was a Danish statesman and landholder. He served as Rotal Treasurer from 1617 to 1627, Governor-General of Norway from 1629 to 1642 and as Cahncellor of the Realm from 1646.

Early life and education
Urne was born at Halsted Priory on the island of Lolland, Denmark.
He was a son of Knud Axelsen Urne til Årsmarke (1564–1622) and Margrethe Eilersdatter Grubbe til Alslev (1568–1654). He was a brother-in-law of Ove Gjedde who married his sister Dorothy Knudsdatter Urne (1600-1667). He attended Sorø Academy 1605-09 and travelled 6 years in Europe.

Career
Urne became secretary of the chancellor of Denmark until he became a treasurer in 1617, which he remained until 1627. In 1627 was granted supervision of 
Nykøbing and Ålholm and made commissioner-general of the market towns of Lolland and Falster. He served as Steward of Norway from 1629 to 1642. After 13 years in Norway he returned to Denmark.

In 1646, Urne succeeded Just Høg as Chancellor of the Realm  (rigskansler). He escorted Christian IV to the Norwegian herredag in Christiania.

Property
He inherited  Knuthenborg Årsmarke from his father. His wife brought Søbysøgård into the marriage. He also bought Nielstrup and Fårevejle.

Throughout his career he was rewarded with numerous royal fiefs. They included Aalholm, Akershus, Tranekær and Dragsholm. From 1658 he was granted Lyse Abbey which he exchanged  the year after for Halsnøy Abbey which he retained until his death in 1663.

Personal life
On 18 July 1624 Urne married Sophie Hansdatter Lindenov (1608-1652), daughter of Hans Johansen Lindenov and Lisbeth Sophie Rantzau. In 1628 they became the parents of  Christian Urne (1628–1669) later a magistrate on Funen.

Christoffer Urne donated a new altarpiece to the church Egebjerg Church in Odsherred. He died on 27 September 1663 and was buried in Nykøbing Falster.

References

1593 births
1663 deaths
People from Lolland
Danish civil servants
Governors-general of Norway
Urne family